Ashley Rindsberg is an American novelist, media commentator, essayist and journalist based in Israel. Rindsberg's most recent book, The Gray Lady Winked, is an investigation of The New York Times. Rindsberg's first book is a collection of short fiction called Tel Aviv Stories.

Early life
Rindsberg was born in South Africa and raised in Philadelphia, Las Vegas and San Diego. He attended Cornell University where he double majored in Philosophy and Science & Technology Studies.

At Cornell, Rindsberg worked on the History of Recent Science and Technology (HRST) Program, led by MIT's Dibner Institute for the History of Science and Technology, helping to digitize a paper archive of the country's first university-level materials science department.

Career

After graduating from Cornell, Rindsberg began working at the Internet Archive, where he led the Bookmobile Program, developed by Archive founder and digital pioneer Brewster Kahle. In 2003, Rindsberg traveled to Egypt to create a mobile digital printing unit for the Bibliotheca Alexandrina that could supply books for programs aimed at improving literacy among Egyptian children.

Works

The Gray Lady Winked (2021)
In 2021, Rindsberg published The Gray Lady Winked: How the New York Times's Misreporting, Distortions and Fabrications Radically Alter History. The book consists of 10 chapters each of which look at how instances of major reporting by The New York Times impacted American and world policy, politics and history.

The book was a response to Rindsberg learning from William L. Shirer's The Rise and Fall of the Third Reich that, at the outset of World War II, The New York Times reported that Poland invaded Germany.

Chapters in the book focus on The New York Times coverage of the Second World War, the Holocaust, Stalin's Russia, the Cuban Revolution, the Vietnam War, the Atomic bombing of Japan, the Second Intifada, the Iraq War and search for Weapons of Mass Destruction, and the 1619 Project.

Rindsberg says misreporting and inaccuracies at The New York Times have had a substantial impact on international events, not only setting the agenda for the news, but influencing what millions of people believe to be factual.

Tel Aviv Stories (2011)
In 2011, Rindsberg released his first book, a collection of short fiction called Tel Aviv Stories: Israeli Short Fiction from the Heart of the Mideast. The book received critical praise, including from Kirkus Reviews, which called it "an empathetic set of character studies" and noted the book's use of "fresh metaphors" and a "flâneur protagonist common to W.G. Sebald and Teju Cole."

Jeremy Last of The Jerusalem Post said the book "offers a deeply personal and rather melancholy take on the city. Tel Aviv Stories showcases its underbelly, warts and all, and does so in a manner that leaves the reader wondering out loud."

References

External links 
 
 Midnight Oil Publishers

Living people
1981 births
American people of South African descent
Jewish American writers
21st-century American writers
21st-century American non-fiction writers
Cornell University alumni
American male journalists
21st-century American male writers
21st-century American Jews
The New York Times